The 26th Luna Awards were held on February 8, 2009, at the Mandarin Oriental Suites and they honored the best Filipino films of the year 2007. It was delayed from September 2008 to February 2009 because the producer, Manio Events, encountered problems with sponsor solicitation. The Academy and the Film Development Council of the Philippines ended up producing the awards night.

The nominees were announced by Jason Abalos, Leo Martinez and Candy Pangilinan on August 29, 2008, at SM Megamall Cinema. A Love Story received the most nominations with nine. Sakal, Sakali, Saklolo followed with eight.

The winners were announced beforehand on December 18, 2008. A Love Story received most of the awards with five awards, including Best Picture.

Winners and nominees

Special awards

Multiple nominations and awards

References

External links
 Official Website of the Film Academy of the Philippines

Luna Awards
2007 film awards
2009 in Philippine cinema